Lupis may refer to:

 Lupis, an Ancient Roman cognomen
 Lupis (food), an Indonesian sweet cake
 Antonio Lupis (1649–1701), prolific Italian writer
 Ivan Lupis (1813–1875), Italian-Croatian naval officer and inventor
 Giuseppe Lupis (1896–1979), Italian journalist and politician

See also
 Lupus (disambiguation)